Derrick Hyman is a paralympic athlete from South Africa competing mainly in category THW6 shot and javelin events.

Derrick competed in the 1992 Summer Paralympics in the shot put and javelin, winning the javelin in a new world record but only managing seventh in the shot put.

References

External links
 

Paralympic athletes of South Africa
Athletes (track and field) at the 1992 Summer Paralympics
Paralympic gold medalists for South Africa
Living people
Medalists at the 1992 Summer Paralympics
Year of birth missing (living people)
Paralympic medalists in athletics (track and field)
South African male javelin throwers
South African male shot putters
Wheelchair javelin throwers
Wheelchair shot putters
Paralympic javelin throwers
Paralympic shot putters